Oslo Cathedral — formerly Our Savior's Church — is the main church for the Church of Norway Diocese of Oslo, as well as the parish church for downtown Oslo. The present building dates from 1694–1697.

The Norwegian Royal Family and the Norwegian Government use the Cathedral for public events. It was closed for renovation in August 2006 and re-opened with a festive high mass on 18 April 2010.

History
The current Oslo Cathedral is the third cathedral in Oslo, Norway.

For almost 500 years, Hallvards Cathedral was the most important church in the city. After a great fire in Oslo during 1624, King Christian IV decided to move the city a few kilometers west to be protected by Akershus Fortress. Construction of a new church was begun in 1632, on the main square in the new city. After that, Hallvards Cathedral fell into disrepair and decayed.

In 1639 the second cathedral was built (Hellig Trefoldighet). This cathedral burnt down after only 50 years, however, and the current cathedral was built to replace it. The church was probably designed by Jørgen Wiggers, the Councillor of the State (etatsråd). The current cathedral was erected on a small rocky outcrop in the east end of what would later become Stortorvet. The foundation stone was laid in 1694 and the church was consecrated in November 1697.

In August 2001, Oslo Cathedral was the site of the wedding of Prince Haakon, and Princess Mette-Marit Tjessem Høiby.

Restoration

The Cathedral was rebuilt between 1848-1850 after a plan by German-born architect, Alexis de Chateauneuf (1799-1853). Another German-born architect, Heinrich Ernst Schirmer (1814-1887) was the construction manager for the project. When Chateauneuf became ill in 1850, Schirmer retained Wilhelm von Hanno (1826-1882) to complete the project.

Oslo Cathedral is located at Stortorvet square north/north-east of Karl Johans gate, between Kirke gate and Dronningens gate. The Cathedral's lower end is surrounded by the Bazaar         (Basarene ved Oslo domkirke), a curved long building with a tower covered in green copper like the Cathedral.  Integrated with Basarene is the Fire Watch  (Brannvakten) which served as Oslo's main fire station from 1860 until 1939, when today's main fire station at Arne Garborgs plass was opened. The Cathedral, Basarene and Brannvakten are all built in red brick. Both Basarene and Brannvakten were built between the years 1840-1859 from the plans of City Architect, Christian H. Grosch.

Art works from recent times in the cathedral include stained glass windows in the choir by Emanuel Vigeland installed between 1910–16, west portal's bronze doors executed by Dagfin Werenskiold (1892-1977) in 1938, and the  silver sculpture with communion scene by Italian sculptor Arrigo Minerbi dating from 1930. The ceiling decorations are by Norwegian painter Hugo Lous Mohr (1889-1970). In the latter half of the 1990s, the main organ built by Ryde & Berg of Fredrikstad, was mounted behind the old baroque facade.

Restoration was completed at the time of the city's 900 anniversary in 1950.  The church was restored under the plans of architect Arnstein Arneberg. The neo-Gothic interior was removed and the original furnishings brought back. Arneberg also designed the chapel on the south side of the church. The church was closed in August 2006 for renovation and was opened in April 2010 in the presence of Harald V of Norway and the Norwegian royal family.

Bishops of Oslo since the Reformation

 1541–1545 Hans Rev 
 1545–1548 Anders Madssøn 
 1548–1580 Frants Berg 
 1580–1600 Jens Nilssøn 
 1601–1607 Anders Bendssøn Dall 
 1607–1617 Niels Claussøn Senning 
 1617–1639 Niels Simonsen Glostrup 
 1639–1646  
 1646–1664 Henning Stockfleth 
 1664–1699 Hans Rosing 
 1699–1712 Hans Munch 
 1713–1730 Bartholomæus Deichman 
 1731–1737 Peder Hersleb
 1738–1758 Niels Dorph 
 1758–1773 Frederik Nannestad 
 1773–1804 Christen Schmidt 
 1805–1822 Frederik Julius Bech
 1823–1845 Christian Sørensen 
 1846–1874 Jens Lauritz Arup 
 1875–1893 Carl Peter Parelius Essendrop 
 1893–1896 
 1896–1912 Anton Christian Bang 
 1912–1922 Jens Frølich Tandberg
 1922–1937 
 1937–1951 Eivind Berggrav
 1951–1968 Johannes Smemo 
 1968–1973 Fridtjov Søiland Birkeli
 1973–1977 Kaare Støylen 
 1977–1998 Andreas Aarflot 
 1998–2005 Gunnar Stålsett
 2005–2017 Ole Christian Kvarme
 2017-     Kari Veiteberg

Organs and organists

The cathedral's first organ was built in 1711 by Carl Gustav Luckvitz, while the current main organ was built by Jan Ryde in 1997 for the 300-year anniversary. The two smaller organs in the cathedral were also built by  Ryde og Berg Orgelbyggeri.

Organists
 1709–1721 Christian Olsen Rode
 1721–1764 Johan Fredrik Clasen
 1764–1769 Johan Adolph Pløen
 1769–1809 Johan Krøyer
 1809–1828 Fredrik Christian Groth
 1820–1826 Frederik Christian Lindeman
 1828–1840 Jacob Andreas Lindeman
 1840–1887 Ludvig Mathias Lindeman
 1887–1916 Christian Cappelen
 1913–1916 Wilhelm Huus-Hansen
 1916–1932 Eyvind Alnæs
 1933–1966 Arild Sandvold
 1966–1982 Rolf Karlsen
 1982–  Terje Kvam
 1982–  Kåre Nordstoga

Carillon and carillonneurs
 In 1924 Oslo Cathedral received a donation of 24,000 NOK for a carillon in the belfry, but this was never implemented. In 2003 a second donation, by Ørnulf Myklestad, resulted in a 48-bell concert carillon under the direction of carillonneur Vegar Sandholt. This carillon is inside the tower not the belfry, and the acoustical problems arising this location have been highlighted in a 2005 masters thesis by Laura Rueslåtten for the Scandinavian Carillon School.

From December 2016 the carillon has been in regular use for hour, quarter-strokes and ritornelles, with contributions by Vegar Sandholt and Kåre Nordstoga, programmed and maintained by Brynjar Landmark, and with 18 different melodies between 7:00 am and midnight, changing according to the calendar.

See also 

List of cathedrals in Norway
Church of Norway
Nidaros Cathedral

References

Other sources
 Gervin, Karl Oslo domkirke: mennesker og miljøer i 900 år [Oslo Cathedral: People and Community for 900 Years] (1997) , 
 (no) Storsletten, Ola Kirker i Norge, b. 5: Etter reformasjonen : 1600-tallet [Churches in Norway, Vol. 5: After the Reformation: The 1600s] (2008) 
 (no) Tronshaug, Hans Jacob Oslo domkirkes orgelhistorie : orgler, organister, kantorer og orgelbyggere gjennom fem århundrer [The Organ of the Oslo Cathedral: Organs, Organists, Cantors and Organ Buiiders through Five Centuries] (1998)

External links

Official website

Christian bell towers
Buildings and structures in Oslo
Carillons
Cathedrals in Norway
Lutheran cathedrals in Norway
Lutheran churches in Oslo